Ashland County is the name of two counties in the United States:

Ashland County, Ohio
Ashland County, Wisconsin

See also
Ashland (disambiguation)